Txamantxoia or Maze (1,945 m) is a mountain in the Pyrenees. It is located between the Ansó Valley in Aragon and the Belagua Valley in Navarre, Spain.

External links

Mendikat - Txamantxoia 

Mountains of Aragon
Mountains of Navarre
Mountains of the Pyrenees
One-thousanders of Spain